Ziyar ibn Shahrakuya (also spelled Shahrakawayh), was a high-ranking Gilaki military officer who served the Buyids.

Ziyar was the son of Shahrakawayh, the son of Harusindan, the maternal uncle of the Ziyarid ruler Mardavij. Ziyar had a cousin, who married the Buyid ruler Adud al-Dawla, and bore him one son named Abu Kalijar Marzuban. During that period, Ziyar, along with a Daylamite officer named Fuladh ibn Manadhar, dominated the Buyid court of Baghdad. 

After the death of Adud al-Dawla in 983, the Buyid Empire was thrown into civil war; the Empire was disputed between his two sons Abu Kalijar Marzuban (who took the name Samsam al-Dawla) and Sharaf al-Dawla. The Turkic soldiers of Iraq shortly betrayed Samsam al-Dawla, and went towards to the court of Sharaf al-Dawla. However, Ziyar managed to make most of them change their mind and stay loyal to Samsam al-Dawla. In 987, Sharaf al-Dawla marched towards Baghdad and deposed Samsam al-Dawla. He then imprisoned Fuladh and had Ziyar executed.

Sources 
 
 

Gilaki people
Buyid generals
987 deaths
10th-century Iranian people
Year of birth unknown
People executed by the Buyid dynasty